River Oaks School is a private PK3–12 school in Monroe, Louisiana that was founded as a segregation academy.

History
River Oaks School was as founded in 1969 as a segregation academy in response to the court ordered desegregation of public schools. In 1984, the school's alleged racially discriminatory admission policy formed part of the basis of the Supreme Court case Allen v. Wright.

Athletics
River Oaks School athletics competes in the LHSAA.

Football
Football championships
(1) LISA State Championship: 1990
(2) MPSA/MAIS State Championships: 2005, 2010

Football championship history
The River Oaks Mustangs football team won its first championship was in 1990, when it was still part of the now defunct Louisiana Independent School Association with a 12–0 season, defeating Central Private School 28–6. In 2005, the football team led to another undefeated season with 14–0, along with its first MPSA championship, winning against Lee Academy (AR) 32–29 in overtime. In 2010, the football team again led to a championship with a 13–1 record, defeating Leake Academy (MS) 40–13 in MAIS.

Football facilities
The football team plays at Woody Boyles Memorial Stadium at Robert Hannah Field.

Soccer 
The River Oaks soccer team has won five MAIS state titles, in 2005, 2006, 2007, 2008, and in 2020.

Notable alumni
Kevin Griffin, frontman of Better Than Ezra
 Gene Johnson, football player and coach

Notable faculty
 Frank Scelfo, Head Football Coach of Southeastern Louisiana Lions football, football coach from 1985-1986

References

External links
 School Website

Buildings and structures in Monroe, Louisiana
Schools in Ouachita Parish, Louisiana
Segregation academies in Louisiana
Private schools in Louisiana
1970 establishments in Louisiana